Petroplus Holdings AG was Europe's largest independent oil refiner by capacity. When the now defunct company was first formed in 1993, it was known as Petroplus International N.V., and was based in the Netherlands.  In August 1998, it was listed on the Amsterdam Stock Exchange.  In April 2005, it was delisted from the Euronext Amsterdam stock exchange when the company was acquired by a holding company. In November 2006, the company went public on the Swiss Stock Exchange.

Acquisitions
In 1997, it acquired the Antwerp N.V. Refinery from the Daewoo Group.

In May 2000, it bought the Cressier Refinery, in Cressier, Switzerland from Shell Switzerland.  In December 2000, it bought the Teesside Refinery in Port Clarence from Phillips Petroleum Company.

In May 2006, it bought the BRC Antwerp Refinery for $511m from Sovereign Holding Ltd (Bermuda).

In March 2007, it bought the Ingolstadt Refinery from ExxonMobil for $425m. In June 2007, it bought the Coryton Refinery near London from BP for $1.4bn.

In April 2008, it bought the Petit Couronne Refinery and Reichstett Refinery, located in France from Shell for $785m.

Financial problems
In December 2011 a $1bn credit line to the company was frozen by its bank lenders. The company was planning to shut down some refineries if negotiations to restore the credit failed. The chief executive said they would do all they could to avoid bankruptcy. On 24 January 2012, Petroplus announced that they were filing for insolvency after it defaulted on $1.75 billion of senior notes and convertible bonds.

Former refineries

Antwerp N.V. Refinery (Belgium) sold to VTTI and renamed Antwerp Terminal & Processing Company (ATPC)
BRC Antwerp Refinery (Belgium) sold to Gunvor
Coryton Refinery (UK) closed
Cressier Refinery (Switzerland) sold to Varo Energy
Ingolstadt Refinery (Germany) sold to Gunvor
Petit Couronne Refinery (France) closed
Reichstett Refinery (France) closed
Teesside Refinery (UK) closed

References

External links

BP sells the Coryton Refinery
February 2007 Times article
Petroplus at Yahoo! Finance

 
Oil and gas companies of Switzerland